Football at the 2015 National Games of India was held in Calicut (men) and Thrissur (women), Kerala from 1 to 10 February 2015.

Men's tournament

Group stage

Knockout stage

Semi finals

Bronze medal match

Final

Women's tournament

Group stage

National Games
2015 National Games of India